Piekarski (feminine: Piekarska; plural: Piekarscy) is a Polish surname. It may refer to:

 Frank Piekarski (1879–1951), American football player
 Grzegorz Piekarski (born 1986), Polish luger
 Julie Piekarski (born 1963), American actress
 Katarzyna Piekarska (born 1967), Polish politician
 Magdalena Piekarska (born 1986), Polish fencer
 Małgosia Piekarska (born 1954), Polish actress
 Marcin Piekarski (luger) (born 1983), Polish luger
 Mariusz Piekarski (born 1975), Polish footballer
 Michał Piekarski (died 1620), Polish attempted assassin
 Piotr Piekarski (athlete) (born 1964), Polish middle distance runner
 Piotr Piekarski (footballer) (born 1993), Polish footballer
 Wacław Piekarski (1893–1979), Polish military officer
 Yisroel Yitzchok Piekarski (1905–1993), Polish-American rabbi

See also
 
 

Polish-language surnames